The 2015–16 Kennesaw State Owls women's basketball team represent Kennesaw State University during the 2015–16 NCAA Division I Basketball Season. The Owls, led by fourth year head coach Nitra Perry. They play their home games at the KSU Convocation Center, in Kennesaw, Georgia and were members of the Atlantic Sun Conference. They finished the season 11–19, 6–8 in A-Sun play to finish in fifth place. They lost in the quarterfinals of A-Sun Tournament to Stetson.

On March 7, head coach Nitra Perry's contract was not renewed. She finished a four-year record at Kennesaw State of 41–80.

Roster

Schedule

|-
!colspan=9 style="background:#000000; color:white;"| Exhibition

|-
!colspan=9 style="background:#000000; color:white;"| Non-conference regular season

|-
!colspan=9 style="background:#000000; color:white;"| Atlantic Sun Conference season

|-
!colspan=9 style="background:#000000; color:white;"| Atlantic Sun Women's Tournament

See also
 2015–16 Kennesaw State Owls men's basketball team

References

Kennesaw State
Kennesaw State Owls women's basketball seasons